Vitkauskas is a surname. Notable people with the surname include:

Armantas Vitkauskas (born 1989), Lithuanian footballer
Vladas Vitkauskas (born 1953), Lithuanian mountain climber
Vincas Vitkauskas (1890–1965), Lithuanian general

Lithuanian-language surnames